Ann Rankin was a former netball player who played on six occasions for the New Zealand national netball team, being part of the team that won the 1967 World Netball Championships.

Career
Ann Rankin (née Boelee) was born on 1 December 1940. She played her early netball with Canterbury before being selected for the Silver Ferns, the national netball team, in 1967. Coached by Taini Jamison and with Judy Blair as captain, New Zealand won its first world cup at the 1967 world championships, which were held in Perth, Western Australia. The team won all seven of its matches, with the first, against South Africa, being Rankin's debut as a Silver Fern. In the tournament the gold medal was secured with a 40–34 victory over Australia, the main rivals. Rankin was the 38th person to have been selected for the team and she played in the centre (C) position.

References

1940 births
Living people
New Zealand international netball players
1967 World Netball Championships players